Gerboise bleue is a 2009 documentary film.

Synopsis 
Between 1960 and 1966, France carried out four atmospheric nuclear tests and another thirteen underground tests south of Reggane (Algerian Sahara). The first was called Gerboise bleue ("Blue Jerboa") and was four times as powerful as the bomb dropped on Hiroshima.
 
Fifty years later, the French Army still refuses to acknowledge its responsibility towards the populations exposed to radiation from the explosions. For the first time, French and Tuareg survivors speak of their fight to have their illnesses recognized as such, and reveal in what the conditions the tests were carried out.

Awards 
 Festival internacional de cine francófono de Tübingen-Stuttgart 2009

References 

 ^ 
 ^ Jump up to: a b 
 ^ 
 ^ 
 ^ 
 ^ Jump up to: a b 
 ^ Jump up to: a b 
 ^ Jump up to: a b French Senate report
 ^ 
 ^ 
 ^ 
 ^ Jump up to: a b c d Essais nucléaires : Gerboise verte, la bombe et le scoop qui font plouf... (actualisé), Jean-Dominique Merchet, Libération
 ^ 
 ^ Hourra pour la France ! Depuis ce matin, elle est plus forte et plus fière.
 ^ Il y a cinquante ans, la France réalisait son premier essai nucléaire, Jean-Dominique Merchet, Libération, 13 February 2010
 ^ Sahara: les cobayes de «Gerboise verte», Le Nouvel Observateur, Vincent Jauvert, 5 February 1998
 ^ 
 ^ 
 ^ 
 ^ 
 ^ Cereceda, Rafael. "Irony as Saharan dust returns radiation from French nuclear tests in the 1960s". euronews. Retrieved 3 March 2021.

External links 
 
 

2009 films
Creative Commons-licensed documentary films
Algerian documentary films
French documentary films
2009 documentary films
Documentary films about nuclear war and weapons
Anti-nuclear films
French nuclear weapons testing
2000s French films